Michael French is a British actor.

Michael French may also refer to:

 Michael French (firefighter), firefighter who was killed during the Charleston Sofa Super Store fire
 Mike French (born 1953), Canadian lacrosse player
 Michael Bryan French, American actor
 Micky French, English footballer

See also 
 Michael ffrench-O'Carroll (1919–2007), Irish medical doctor